Bidule is a commercial software application for the creation of interactive computer music and multimedia produced by the Canadian company Plogue Arts and Technology. It runs on both Windows and Mac computers.

Bidule uses a modular structure based on a patch cord metaphor much like AudioMulch, Reaktor, Pure Data, and Max/MSP.  Individual modules are called bidules (the Plogue web site states that the word "Bidule" is French for "thingy" or "gadget"). A set of bidules and connections is called a layout, and sub-patches called groups can be built within layouts and saved for use elsewhere. The program features real time audio, MIDI, Open Sound Control (OSC), and spectral processing. With other audio DAW software ReWire, Bidule can run as a ReWire mixer or device. Bidule can run standalone or as a VST, VSTi or AU plugin, and can host the same. ASIO/CoreAudio is supported for low latency audio. Bidule can use multithread processing, and there is a beta build for discrete processing. Parameters can be linked to MIDI or OSC input or to other module parameters. Over one hundred modules and groups come with the software, including modules that can perform high-level math on signals.

References

External links 
 

Audio programming languages
Electronic music software
Visual programming languages
Software synthesizers